Richard Machalek (born April 12, 1946) is a social theorist, sociobiologist, and professor of sociology.

A student and colleague of sociobiologist E.O. Wilson, Machalek is best known for using traditional sociological frameworks and theories to explain complex social behavior and structures in non-human societies, with a special emphasis on ant populations.

Machalek has repeatedly – and only half jokingly – called for a “one-hundred year moratorium on studying humans within the field of sociology” and he thus believes that the bedrock of sociological knowledge lies in explaining social phenomena that are exhibited across many different types of species. He can be, and often is, considered a radical sociological theorist in this regard. As such, Machalek also applies knowledge from the fields of evolutionary theory, zoology, and biology and is especially concerned with the trans-species social behaviors of cheating, cooperation, and division of labor, among others.

Besides teaching at a number of universities, in 1986 he was a visiting professor at Harvard University’s Museum of Comparative Zoology under the tutelage of E.O. Wilson.  He was a visiting professor at the U.S. Air Force Academy, conducted research on fruit bats (Chiroptera) in Queensland, Australia, and has served in the board of many journals and professional societies.  His contribution to the understanding of the biological underpinnings of social life, and his award-winning teaching, has instilled generations with an appreciation of evolutionary theory and the evolutionary elements of social life.

His research spans a wide array of topics, and is noted for its rigorous theoretical structure and elegant writing. The corpus of Machalek's work is immense, varied, and foundational to the field.  He currently teaches sociology at the University of Wyoming.

See also
 E.O. Wilson
 Sociobiology
 Evolutionary psychology

External links
 Machalek's University of Wyoming Faculty page - Including Vita, publications, and contact info.

American sociologists
Human evolution theorists
Harvard University staff
University of Wyoming faculty
1946 births
Living people
Sociobiologists